Apayao may refer to:

Apayao Province, since 1995 a province in the Philippines
Apayao language
Apayao people, also called Isneg
Apayao River